Nectria is a genus of Ascomycete fungi. They are most often encountered as saprophytes on decaying wood but some species can also occur as parasites of trees, especially fruit trees (for example apple) and a number of other hardwood trees. Some species are significant pests causing diseases such as apple canker, Nectria twig blight, and coral spot in orchards.

It is ubiquitous in cool temperate Europe and North America and appears to be an introduced species in New Zealand and Australia. The occurrence in New Zealand was first identified in 1996 in Otago and Southland although it is believed to have been present since the 1980s. In North America, Nectria infections have had economically important impacts on forestry and forest products including aspen, red oak, maple, beech, poplar, and birch. Species of Nectria also occur in warmer climates including island groups such as Hawaii. According to the Dictionary of the Fungi (10th edition, 2008), the genus contains 82 species.

Species

 Nectria cinnabarina
 Nectria coccinea
 Nectria ditissima
 Nectria diversispora
 Nectria eustromatica
 Nectria foliicola
 Nectria fragilis
 Nectria fuckeliana
 Nectria galligena
 Nectria haematococca
 Nectria episphaeria
 Nectria magnoliae
 Nectria mammoidea var. rubi
 Nectria mauritiicola
 Nectria peziza
 Nectria pseudotrichia
 Nectria punicea
 Nectria radicicola
 Nectria ramulariae

References

 
Nectriaceae genera